The Buma Cultuur Pop Award (De Popprijs) is presented each January to a person or artist for making the most important contribution to Dutch pop music during the past year. The winner is appointed by a professional jury.

The Pop Award is presented by Buma Cultuur, an organization which encourages and promotes Dutch music, supported by the Dutch music rights foundation Buma/Stemra.

The first four editions of the prize were named BV Popprijs. The first edition of the award was presented to Mathilde Santing in discotheque Escape in Amsterdam on November 25, 1985 for her achievements of that year. The prize for 1986 was presented in January 1987 to Claw Boys Claw, establishing the practice to present the award in the following year. The two other awards bearing the name BV Popprijs were awarded to Herman Brood (1987) and The Nits (1988). For 1989 no award was presented. On May 20, 1991 the Urban Dance Squad receives the award for 1990, now named the Pop Award (Popprijs).

Since 1992 the award is presented during Noorderslag, which takes place on the last day of the European music conference and showcase festival Eurosonic Noorderslag in Groningen.

Since 1994 the winning artist is covered in beer thrown by the audience. Because of this, audio equipment is covered in plastic to prevent damage, the jury does not announce the winner on stage, and artists often bring umbrella's to protect themselves. Radio-DJ Giel Beelen protested against the throwing of beer on stage before presenting the prize in 2015. Days before Noorderslag 2016 the organization announced that the audience would not be allowed to bring drinks into the main hall (where the award is presented) to prevent beer throwing.

The presentation of the award is broadcast live on Dutch public television since 2008 as part of the broadcast of the Noorderslag festival.

Winners 
 1985 – Mathilde Santing
 1986 – Claw Boys Claw
 1987 - Herman Brood
 1988 – The Nits
 1990 – Urban Dance Squad
 1991 – The Ex
 1992 – The Scene
 1993 – Bettie Serveert
 1994 – 2 Unlimited
 1995 – Osdorp Posse
 1996 – Eboman
 1997 – Marco Borsato
 1998 – Junkie XL
 1999 – Postmen
 2000 – Arling & Cameron
 2001 – Anouk
 2002 – Tiësto
 2003 – BLØF
 2004 – Ali B
 2005 – Within Temptation
 2006 – Spinvis
 2007 – Armin van Buuren
 2008 – De Dijk
 2009 – Kyteman
 2010 – Caro Emerald
 2011 - De Jeugd van Tegenwoordig
 2012 - Racoon
 2013 - The Opposites
 2014 - The Common Linnets
 2015 - New Wave

References

External links 
 http://www.bumacultuur.nl
 http://www.eurosonic-noorderslag.nl/en/

Dutch music awards
Awards established in 1985
1985 establishments in the Netherlands